This is a list of 124 species in Endasys, a genus of ichneumon wasps in the family Ichneumonidae.

Endasys species

 Endasys albior Luhman, 1990 i c g
 Endasys albitexanus Luhman, 1990 i c g
 Endasys alutaceus (Habermehl, 1912) c g
 Endasys amoenus (Habermehl, 1912) c g
 Endasys analis (Thomson, 1883) c g
 Endasys anglianus Sawoniewicz & Luhman, 1992 c g
 Endasys angularis Luhman, 1990 i c g
 Endasys annulatus (Habermehl, 1912) c g
 Endasys areolellae Sawoniewicz & Luhman, 1992 c g
 Endasys arizonae Luhman, 1990 i c g
 Endasys arkansensis Luhman, 1990 i c g
 Endasys aurantifex Luhman, 1990 i c g
 Endasys aurarius Luhman, 1990 i c g
 Endasys aureolus Luhman, 1990 i c g
 Endasys auriculiferus (Viereck, 1917) i c g
 Endasys aurigena Luhman, 1990 i c g
 Endasys auriger Luhman, 1990 i c g
 Endasys bicolor (Lundbeck, 1897) i c g
 Endasys bicolorescens Luhman, 1990 i c g
 Endasys brachyceratus Luhman, 1990 i c g
 Endasys brevicornis Luhman, 1990 i c g
 Endasys brevis (Gravenhorst, 1829) c g
 Endasys brunnulus Sawoniewicz & Luhman, 1992 c g
 Endasys callidius Luhman, 1990 i c g
 Endasys callistus Luhman, 1990 i c g
 Endasys chiricahuanus Luhman, 1990 i c g
 Endasys chrysoleptus Luhman, 1990 i c g
 Endasys cnemargus (Gravenhorst, 1829) c g
 Endasys concavus Luhman, 1990 i c g
 Endasys coriaceus Luhman, 1990 i c g
 Endasys daschi Luhman, 1990 i c g
 Endasys declivis Luhman, 1990 i c g
 Endasys durangensis Luhman, 1990 i c g
 Endasys elegantulus Luhman, 1990 i c g
 Endasys erythrogaster (Gravenhorst, 1829) c g
 Endasys eurycerus (Thomson, 1896) c g
 Endasys euryops Luhman, 1990 i c g
 Endasys euxestus (Speiser, 1908) c g
 Endasys femoralis (Habermehl, 1912) c g
 Endasys flavissimus Luhman, 1990 i c g
 Endasys flavivittatus Luhman, 1990 i c g
 Endasys gibbosus Gonzalez-Moreno & Bordera g
 Endasys gracilis Luhman, 1990 i c g
 Endasys granulifacies Luhman, 1990 c g
 Endasys hesperus Luhman, 1990 i c g
 Endasys hexamerus Luhman, 1990 i c g
 Endasys hungarianus Sawoniewicz & Luhman, 1992 c g
 Endasys inflatus (Provancher, 1875) i c g
 Endasys julianus Luhman, 1990 i c g
 Endasys kinoshitai Uchida, 1955 c g
 Endasys latissimus Luhman, 1990 i c g
 Endasys leioleptus Luhman, 1990 i c g
 Endasys leopardus Luhman, 1990 i c g
 Endasys leptotexanus Luhman, 1990 i c g
 Endasys leucocnemis Luhman, 1990 i c g
 Endasys liaoningensis Wang, Sun, Ma & Sheng, 1996 c g
 Endasys lissorulus Sawoniewicz & Luhman, 1992 c g
 Endasys lygaeonematus (Uchida, 1931) c g
 Endasys maculatus (Provancher, 1875) i c g
 Endasys magnocellus Sawoniewicz & Luhman, 1992 c g
 Endasys megamelanus Sawoniewicz & Luhman, 1992 c g
 Endasys melanistus Sawoniewicz & Luhman, 1992 c g
 Endasys melanogaster Luhman, 1990 i c g
 Endasys melanopodis Sawoniewicz & Luhman, 1992 c g
 Endasys melanurus (Roman, 1909) i c g
 Endasys michiganensis Luhman, 1990 i c g
 Endasys microcellus Sawoniewicz & Luhman, 1992 c g
 Endasys minutulus (Thomson, 1883) i c g
 Endasys monticola (Dalla Torre, 1902) i c g
 Endasys morulus (Kokujev, 1909) c g
 Endasys mucronatus (Provancher, 1879) i c
 Endasys nemati Luhman, 1990 i c g
 Endasys nigrans Luhman, 1990 i c g
 Endasys nitidus (Habermehl, 1912) c g
 Endasys obscurus Luhman, 1990 i c g
 Endasys occipitis Luhman, 1990 i c g
 Endasys oregonianus Luhman, 1990 i c g
 Endasys paludicola (Brues, 1908) i c g
 Endasys parviventris (Gravenhorst, 1829) c g
 Endasys patulus (Viereck, 1911) i c
 Endasys pentacrocus Luhman, 1990 i c g
 Endasys petiolus Sawoniewicz & Luhman, 1992 c g
 Endasys pieninus Sawoniewicz & Luhman, 1992 c g
 Endasys pinidiprionis Luhman, 1990 i c g
 Endasys plagiator (Gravenhorst, 1829) c g
 Endasys praegracilis Sawoniewicz & Luhman, 1992 c g
 Endasys praerotundiceps Luhman, 1990 i c g
 Endasys proteuryopsis Sawoniewicz & Luhman, 1992 c g
 Endasys pseudocallistus Luhman, 1990 i c g
 Endasys pubescens (Provancher, 1974) i c g
 Endasys punctatior Luhman, 1990 i c g
 Endasys rhyssotexanus Luhman, 1990 i c g
 Endasys rotundiceps (Provancher, 1877) i c g
 Endasys rubescens Luhman, 1990 i c g
 Endasys rugiceps Luhman, 1990 i c g
 Endasys rugifacies Sawoniewicz & Luhman, 1992 c g
 Endasys rugitexanus Luhman, 1990 i c g
 Endasys rugosus Luhman, 1990 i c g
 Endasys rusticus (Habermehl, 1912) c
 Endasys santacruzensis Luhman, 1990 i c g
 Endasys senilis (Gmelin, 1790) c g
 Endasys serratus Luhman, 1990 i c g
 Endasys sheni Sheng, 2000 c g
 Endasys spicus Luhman, 1990 i c g
 Endasys spinissimus Luhman, 1990 i c g
 Endasys stictogastris Sawoniewicz & Luhman, 1992 c g
 Endasys striatus (Kiss, 1924) c g
 Endasys subclavatus (Say, 1836) i c g b
 Endasys sugiharai (Uchida, 1936) c g
 Endasys taiganus Luhman, 1990 i c g
 Endasys talitzkii (Telenga, 1961) c g
 Endasys testaceipes (Brischke, 1891) c g
 Endasys testaceus (Taschenberg, 1865) c
 Endasys tetralylus Luhman, 1990 i g
 Endasys tetratylus Luhman, 1990 c g
 Endasys texanus (Cresson) i c
 Endasys thunbergi Sawoniewicz & Luhman, 1992 c g
 Endasys transverseareolatus (Strobl, 1901) c g
 Endasys triannulatus Sawoniewicz & Luhman, 1992 c g
 Endasys tricoloratus Luhman, 1990 i c g
 Endasys tyloidiphorus Luhman, 1990 i c g
 Endasys varipes (Gravenhorst, 1829) c g
 Endasys xanthopyrrhus Luhman, 1990 i c g
 Endasys xanthostomus Luhman, 1990 i c g

Data sources: i = ITIS, c = Catalogue of Life, g = GBIF, b = Bugguide.net

References

Endasys
Articles created by Qbugbot